Rowena Tiempo Torrevillas (born June 13, 1951) is a Filipina poet, fiction writer and essayist.

Personal life and education
She was born to writers Edilberto Tiempo and Edith Tiempo in Dumaguete, Philippines. Torrevillas received a bachelor's degree in 1971, and a masters in 1978, both in creative writing. She also received a PhD in English Literature, all from Silliman University. She married Multimedia artist Lemuel Torrevillas and together they have a daughter,  Lauren Maria Torrevillas Seamans
.

Career
Torrevillas worked for the International Writing Program (IWP) as the associate program coordinator. She worked for the University of Iowa's English department as an adjunct faculty member. Torrevillas has also been the director-in-residence of the Silliman National Writer's Workshop.

Awards
The Palanca Award
 1977 - Second Prize: Prodigal Season
 1978 - Second Prize: Sunday Morning 
 1979 - First Prize: Behind the Fern
 1980 - First Prize: The Fruit of the Vine' 
 1983 -First Prize: Seeress and VoyagerThe Distinguished Author award from the Writers Union of the Philippines
Philippines' National Book Award (1999), (2001)

WorksFlying Over Kansas: Personal Views (1999999)The Sea Gypsies Stay (1999)The World Comes to IowaUpon the Willows and Other Stories (1980)Mountain Sacraments (1991)Generic DreamsThree Times Three:Three Genres by Three Generations of Tiempo WomenThe Roadrunner''

References

Further reading
 "Philippine Writing Workshop Anniversary Celebrated CLAS Ties." University of Iowa News Services. University of Iowa, 6 July 2011. Web. 15 Oct. 2014. <http://www.clas.uiowa.edu/news/2011/07/6philippine.shtml>.
 "Philippine Studies." 

1951 births
Living people
Filipino women writers
People from Dumaguete
Writers from Negros Oriental
Silliman University alumni
University of Iowa faculty